Oficinas del Parque Torre 2 (or Oficinas en el Parque Torre II), it is one of Monterrey's tallest skyscrapers. Its construction began in 1996 and finished two years later, in 1998. The tower, along with its slightly shorter twin, is part of a complex used mainly for offices, as the name states.

The Complex
Tower One and Tower Two were built as part of a complex a few miles west of downtown Monterrey, in the borderline of the Santa Catarina River, an area of Monterrey known as San Jeronimo. The towers were built in around three years and became instant icons because of its unique gigantic purple walls.

Office buildings completed in 1998
Buildings and structures in Monterrey